Unknown Valley is a 1933 American pre-Code Western film directed by Lambert Hillyer and starring Buck Jones, Cecilia Parker and Wade Boteler. It was shot at the Iverson Ranch in California.

Cast
 Buck Jones as Joe Gordon (as Charles 'Buck' Jones)
 Cecilia Parker as Sheila O'Neill (as Cecelia Parker)
 Wade Boteler as Elder Crossett
 Frank McGlynn Sr. as Head Elder (as Frank McGlynn)
 Ward Bond as Elder Snead
 Arthur Wanzer as Tim
 Alf James as Pop Gordon
 Buck Black as Shad O'Neill (as Bret Black)
 Carlota Warwick as Mary James (as Carlotta Warwick)
 Hank Bell as Townsman
 Charles Brinley as Gong-Ringer
 Buck Bucko as Townsman
 Roy Bucko as Townsman
 Frank Ellis as Townsman
 Jack Evans as Man Pointing Out Gordon
 Clarence Geldert as Army Colonel
 Si Jenks as Man at Bridger's Post
 Jack Kirk as Ezra Turner
 Edward LeSaint as Jim Bridger
 Bud McClure as Townsman
 Lew Meehan as Townsman
 Steve Pendleton as Townsman
 Jessie Proctor as Townswoman
 Lucile Sewall as Townswoman
 Al Taylor as Townsman
 Harry Todd as Zeke
 Dorothy Vernon as Townswoman
 Slim Whitaker as Man at Bridger's Post

References

Bibliography
 Balio, Tino. Grand Design: Hollywood as a Modern Business Enterprise, 1930-1939. University of California Press, 1995.
 Pitts, Michael R. Western Movies: A Guide to 5,105 Feature Films. McFarland, 2012.

External links
 

1933 films
1933 Western (genre) films
American Western (genre) films
Films directed by Lambert Hillyer
Columbia Pictures films
American black-and-white films
1930s English-language films
1930s American films